The Park Ridge Public Schools is a comprehensive community public school district that serves students in pre-kindergarten through twelfth grade from Park Ridge, in Bergen County, New Jersey, United States.

As of the 2018–19 school year, the district, comprising three schools, had an enrollment of 1,245 students and 119.4 classroom teachers (on an FTE basis), for a student–teacher ratio of 10.4:1.

The district is classified by the New Jersey Department of Education as being in District Factor Group "I", the second-highest of eight groupings. District Factor Groups organize districts statewide to allow comparison by common socioeconomic characteristics of the local districts. From lowest socioeconomic status to highest, the categories are A, B, CD, DE, FG, GH, I and J.

Schools
Schools in the district (with 2018–19 enrollment data from the National Center for Education Statistics) are:
Elementary schools
East Brook Elementary School with 311 students in grades K-6
Kevin Stokes, Principal
West Ridge Elementary School with 350 students in grades PreK-6
Christopher Kirkby, Principal
High school
Park Ridge High School with 549 students in grades 7-12
Troy Lederman, Principal

Administration
Core members of the district's administration are:
Dr. Robert M. Gamper, Superintendent
Robert Wright, Business Administrator / Board Secretary

Board of education
The district's board of education, with seven members, sets policy and oversees the fiscal and educational operation of the district through its administration. As a Type II school district, the board's trustees are elected directly by voters to serve three-year terms of office on a staggered basis, with either two or three seats up for election each year held (since 2012) as part of the November general election. The board appoints a superintendent to oversee the day-to-day operation of the district.

References

External links
Park Ridge Public Schools
 
Park Ridge Public Schools, National Center for Education Statistics

Park Ridge, New Jersey
New Jersey District Factor Group I
School districts in Bergen County, New Jersey